Ammonium hexachloroplatinate, also known as ammonium chloroplatinate, is the inorganic compound with the formula (NH4)2[PtCl6]. It is a rare example of a soluble platinum(IV) salt that is not hygroscopic. It forms intensely yellow solutions in water. In the presence of 1M NH4Cl, its solubility is only 0.0028 g/100 mL.

Preparation and structure
The compound consists of separate tetrahedral ammonium cations and octahedral [PtCl6]2− anions. It is usually generated as a fine yellow precipitate by treating a solution of hexachloroplatinic acid with a solution of an ammonium salt. The complex is so poorly soluble that this step is employed in the isolation of platinum from ores and recycled residues.

As analyzed by X-ray crystallography, the salt crystallizes in a cubic motif reminiscent of the fluorite structure.  The [PtCl6]2− centers are octahedral.  The NH4+ centers are hydrogen bonded to the chloride ligands.

Uses and reactions
Ammonium hexachloroplatinate is used in platinum plating. Heating (NH4)2[PtCl6] under a stream of hydrogen at 200 °C produces platinum sponge. Treating this with chlorine gives H2[PtCl6].

Safety
Dust containing ammonium hexachloroplatinate can be highly allergenic. "Symptoms range from irritation of skin and mucous membranes to life-threatening attacks of asthma."

Related compounds
Potassium hexachloroplatinate

References

Platinum(IV) compounds
Chloro complexes
Ammonium compounds
Hexachloroplatinates